is a Japanese voice actress from Kanagawa Prefecture, Japan. She is affiliated with Ken Production.

Voice roles

Anime
2013
Diabolik Lovers (Yui Komori)

2014
Haikyū!! (Mao Aihara)

2015
Diabolik Lovers More, Blood (Yui Komori)

2016
Brave Witches (Takami Karibuchi)
D.Gray-man Hallow (Tewaku)
Divine Gate (Mordred)

2018
Märchen Mädchen (Shizuka Tsuchimikado)
The Master of Ragnarok & Blesser of Einherjar (Felicia)
Harukana Receive (Emily Thomas)

2019
Isekai Cheat Magician (Charlotte)
Kemono Michi: Rise Up (Hiroyuki, Altena Elgard Ratis)
Junji Ito Collection (Tomie Kawakami)

2020
Tower of God (Endorsi Jahad)

2022 
Bocchi The Rock (Michiyo Gotō)
2023
Junji Ito Maniac: Japanese Tales of the Macabre (Tomie)

Video games
The Idolmaster Million Live! (Fūka Toyokawa)
Azur Lane (USS Colorado)
Raramagi (Reina Tachibana)
Grand Summoners (Death Sickle Queen Lily)
The King of Fighters All Star (New Brian)
Fate/Grand Order (Galatea)
War of the Visions: Final Fantasy Brave Exvius (Alaya Rundall)

Dubbing

Live-action
Christine (2019 Blu-Ray edition) (Leigh Cabot (Alexandra Paul))
Joy Ride 3: Road Kill (Jewel McCaul (Kirsten Prout))
Machete Kills (Sartana Rivera (Jessica Alba))
War Room (Danielle Jordan (Alena Pitts))

Animation
World of Winx (Flora)

References

External links
 Official agency profile 

Living people
Japanese video game actresses
Japanese voice actresses
Voice actresses from Kanagawa Prefecture
Year of birth missing (living people)
21st-century Japanese actresses
Ken Production voice actors